Atlantogenata is a proposed clade of mammals containing the cohorts or superorders Xenarthra and Afrotheria.  These groups originated and radiated in the South American and African continents, respectively, presumably in the Cretaceous. Together with Boreoeutheria, they make up Eutheria. The monophyly of this grouping was supported by some genetic evidence.

Alternative hypotheses are that Boreoeutheria and Afrotheria combine to form Epitheria (as generally supported by anatomical and other physiological evidence) or that Boreoeutheria and Xenarthra combine to form Exafroplacentalia or Notolegia.

Updated analysis of transposable element insertions around the time of divergence strongly supports the fourth hypothesis of a near-concomitant origin (trifurcation) of the three superorders of mammals: Afrotheria, Boreoeutheria, and Xenarthra.

Below shows the phylogeny of the extant atlantogenate families.

References

Further reading

 
 
 
 

 
Eutheria
Mammal unranked clades
Extant Paleocene first appearances